Attwooll is a surname. Notable people with the surname include: 

David Attwooll (1949–2016), British poet and publisher
Elspeth Attwooll (born 1943), Scottish politician